The Research Academic Computer Technology Institute - RACTI is a research institute in Greece under supervision of the Hellenic Ministry of Education. RACTI is also known as Computer Technology Institute (abbreviated CTI). RACTI's headquarters are located in Patras Greece.

The RA CTI's objectives are defined as follows: 
To conduct basic and applied research in hardware and software technology, networks, and the Information Society's socioeconomic impact 
To design and develop products and services 
To support all kinds of ICT education and training in relation to the Information Society 
To develop technology and transfer know-how 
To provide consultancy, design and administrative services concerning the Information Society to the Ministry of National Education & Religious Affairs and to the public sector in general, to natural and legal entities and social institutions

History about RACTI
The Research Academic Computer Technology Institute (RA-CTI) was founded as the “Computer Technology Institute” in 1985 with headquarters in the city of Patras, as a Non Profit Private Legal Entity (“NPID” under Greek Law), supervised by the General Secretariat of Research and Technology, under the Ministry of Development (Presidential decree, 9/1985).

Since 1992 it is supervised by the Ministry of Education and Religious Affairs, and constitutes an independent institution at the financial, administrative and scientific level. It was renamed as the Research Academic Computer Technology Institute (RA-CTI), according to Article 2 of Law 2909/2001 governing its operation.

According to its institutional framework of operation, it is administered by a director and governed by a nine-member board of directors. At an operational level it functions according to the regulations governing the private sector.

The objectives of RA-CTI according to its institutional framework are:

 To conduct basic and applied research in hardware and software technology, networks and the socio-economic, et al. impacts of the Information Society (InfoSoc).
 To design and develop products and services
 To support all forms of education and training with respect to Information and Communication Technologies and the InfoSoc.
 To develop technology and to transfer know-how
 To provide consulting, planning and administration services, particularly to the Ministry of Education and Religious Affairs and at a broader scale to the public sector, to natural and legal entities, as well as to social institutions in matters dealing with the migration of the country to the Information Society.

The aim of the organisation is to participate in national and European research initiatives, to conduct in basic and applied research, to assimilate international scientific and technological know-how to the highest degree, the continuous scientific and research advancement of its personnel and to align the research it conducts with the specific technological needs of the country.

To achieve its aims, RA-CTI develops partnerships with public and private sector institutions, with universities and research centres at both national and international levels and maintains close ties with the Greek academic community. Four Greek Universities are represented on its executive board.

The RA-CTI is also entitled to establish branches in Greece and abroad, to receive loans and to award postgraduate or post-doctoral grants.

The successful course of the Institute may be credited to the management and personnel, foremost among them being the former acting directors, as it was they who set the solid foundations for the development of a contemporary scientific establishment beyond the Greek capital.

External links
RACTI homepage

Research institutes in Greece